Sainte-Eulalie-d'Ans is a commune in the Dordogne department in Nouvelle-Aquitaine in southwestern France.

It is located on the river Auvézère, about 30 km east of Périgueux and 50 km north of Sarlat-la-Canéda.

It is one of several French communities named after Saint Eulalia.

Population

See also
Communes of the Dordogne department

References

Communes of Dordogne